The 1400s ran from January 1, 1400, to December 31, 1409.

Significant people

References

1400s